Volatility or volatile may refer to:

Chemistry 
 Volatility (chemistry), a measuring tendency of a substance or liquid to vaporize easily
 Relative volatility, a measure of vapor pressures of the components in a liquid mixture
 Volatiles, a group of compounds with low boiling points that are associated with a planet's or moon's crust and atmosphere
 Volatile organic compounds, organic or carbon compounds that can evaporate at normal temperature and pressure
 Volatile anaesthetics, a class of anaesthetics which evaporate or vaporize easily
 Volatile substance abuse, the abuse of household inhalants containing volatile compounds
 Volatile oil, also known as essential oil, an oil derived from plants with aromatic compounds used in cosmetic and flavoring industries 
 Volatile acid/Volatile acidity, a term used inconsisitenly across the fields of winemaking, wastewater treatment, physiology, and other fields

Computer science
 Volatile variables, variables that can be changed by an external process
 Volatile memory, memory that lasts only while the power is on (and thus would be lost after a restart)
 Volatility (memory forensics), an open source memory forensics tool

Other uses
 Volatility (finance), a measure of the risk in a financial instrument
 Volatiles, the volatile compounds of magma (mostly water vapor) that affect the appearance and strength of volcanoes
 Stochastic volatility, in the mathematical theory of probability
 Pedersen index, a measure of electoral volatility in political party systems
One of the components of the set of phenomena known as volatility, uncertainty, complexity and ambiguity
 Volatile Games, a video games maker
 Volatile (A Hero A Fake album), 2008
 Volatile (The Lime Spiders album), 1988